Tikiri Banda Kobbekaduwa is a Sri Lankan politician serving as the 8th Governor of Sabaragamuwa Province of Sri Lanka since 21 November 2019. He previously served as 8th Governor of the Central Province of Sri Lanka from 16 December 2005 to 19 January 2015. He was the chief organiser of Sri Lanka Freedom Party to the Yatinuwara Electoral. He is the nephew of former Agriculture Minister Hector Kobbekaduwa.

He was educated at Trinity College, Kandy and St. Sylvester's College, Kandy.

References

Living people
Year of birth missing (living people)
Governors of Central Province, Sri Lanka
Sinhalese politicians
Sri Lankan Buddhists
Alumni of St. Sylvester's College
Alumni of Trinity College, Kandy
Sri Lanka Freedom Party politicians